Xylopinus is a genus of darkling beetles in the family Tenebrionidae. There are at least three described species in Xylopinus.

Species
These three species belong to the genus Xylopinus:
 Xylopinus aenescens LeConte g b
 Xylopinus saperdoides (Olivier) g b
 Xylopinus saperioides Olivier, 1795 g
Data sources: i = ITIS, c = Catalogue of Life, g = GBIF, b = Bugguide.net

References

Further reading

External links

 
 

Tenebrionidae